Nyctimystes trachydermis, also known as the Morobe big-eyed treefrog, is a species of frog in the subfamily Pelodryadinae of the family Hylidae. It is endemic to Papua New Guinea and occurs in the mountains of southern eastern New Guinea. Its type locality (which it shares with Nyctimystes tyleri) is Gapaia Creek, at  asl between Garaina and Saureli, in the Morobe Province. The specific name trachydermis means "rough skinned", derived from the Greek words trachys and derma.

Description
One gravid female measured . Dorsal surfaces are roughed throughout with small, mostly conical and white-tipped asperities. Dorsal ground colour varies from dark greenish brown to gray. Some specimens have lighter blotches. Iris is reddish brown with distinct vertical pupil. Tympanum is completely concealed. Vocal sac is absent.

Habitat and conservation
Development is presumably direct (i.e., there is no free-living larval stage), as in other species in the genus.

This species is locally common. Sedimentation of streams because of mining is a localized threat to it. It is also collected for food, although it is not known whether this is a threat at present. Its range overlaps with the Mount Kaindi Wildlife Management Area.

References

trachydermis
Amphibians of Papua New Guinea
Endemic fauna of Papua New Guinea
Amphibians of New Guinea
Endemic fauna of New Guinea
Taxa named by Richard G. Zweifel
Amphibians described in 1983
Taxonomy articles created by Polbot